Turkey Pond and Little Turkey Pond are a connected pair of water bodies located in Merrimack County in central New Hampshire, United States, in the city of Concord. The two ponds' elevations are controlled by a single dam at the outlet of Little Turkey Pond. The channel between the two ponds serves as the water course for the crew team for Saint Paul's School of Concord. Water from the Turkey Ponds flows via the Turkey River to the Merrimack River.

The lake is classified as a warmwater fishery, with observed species including largemouth bass, chain pickerel, and horned pout.

Following the 1938 New England hurricane, Turkey Pond was used to hold salvaged logs, which were then processed at an on-site sawmill; it was staffed by women during World War II.

See also

List of lakes in New Hampshire
New Hampshire Historical Marker No. 184: Turkey Pond – 1938 Hurricane

References

Concord, New Hampshire
Lakes of Merrimack County, New Hampshire